Bergans (Bergans Fritid AS) is a Norwegian company and outdoor-brand that develops and manufactures backpacks, tents, sleeping bags, canoes, hiking equipment and technical clothing.

The founder of Bergans, Ole Ferdinand Bergan (1876–1956) was a bike-mechanic in Tønsberg and invented a backpack with an external frame in 1908. Ole F. Bergan registered 45 patents in his lifetime. The Norwegian Armed Forces have been using backpacks from Bergans since 1913.

References

External links

Clothing companies of Norway
Outdoor clothing brands